Admiral Sir James Andrew Fergusson,  (16 April 1871 – 13 April 1942) was a Royal Navy officer who went on to be Commander-in-Chief, America and West Indies Station.

Naval career
Born the son of Sir James Fergusson, 6th Baronet and Lady Edith Christian Ramsay, Fergusson joined the Royal Navy in 1887. He served as a lieutenant on board the cruiser HMS Barrosa when in January 1900 he was landed in Cape Colony to take part in the Second Boer War, during which he was wounded, mentioned in despatches and promoted to commander on 21 October 1900, for services during the war. In 1902 he was posted to the battleship HMS Royal Sovereign, which in August commissioned as coast guard ship at Portsmouth.

He served in World War I commanding the battleships HMS Benbow and HMS Thunderer and seeing action at the Battle of Jutland in 1916. He went on to be Commander of Patrols at Malta and then Commander of the 2nd Light Cruiser Squadron in which capacity he was present at the surrender of the German Fleet.

After the War he became Deputy Chief of the Naval Staff and then Assistant-Chief of the Naval Staff. He became Commander of the 1st Light Cruiser Squadron in 1920 and went on to be Commander-in-Chief, America and West Indies Station in 1924.

Family
In 1901 he married Enid Githa Williams (known by her middle name); they had four daughters. Githa Williams was a daughter of New Zealand landowner and prominent Wellington resident, Thomas Coldham Williams. Her elder sister Eila married Vernon Reed in 1909; he represented the  electorate in the New Zealand House of Representatives.

Fergusson's elder brother Sir Charles Fergusson, 7th Baronet, was 3rd Governor-General of New Zealand (1924–1930).

References

External links
 

|-

1871 births
1942 deaths
Royal Navy admirals
Knights Commander of the Order of the Bath
Knights Commander of the Order of St Michael and St George
James
Younger sons of baronets
Lords of the Admiralty